Henry Franklin Lawrence (January 31, 1868 – January 12, 1950) was a U.S. Representative from Missouri.

Born near Greensburg, Indiana, Lawrence attended the public schools, the local high school, and Stanberry (Missouri) Normal School.
He moved to Cameron, Missouri, and engaged in banking.
He served as clerk of Daviess County 1907-1911.
He served as mayor of Cameron 1914-1918.

Lawrence was elected as a Republican to the Sixty-seventh Congress (March 4, 1921 – March 3, 1923).
He was an unsuccessful candidate for reelection in 1922 to the Sixty-eighth Congress.
He served as a delegate to the Republican National Convention in 1924.
He was employed with the State finance department of Missouri.
He died in Cameron, Missouri, January 12, 1950.
He was interred in Graceland Cemetery.

References

1868 births
1950 deaths
People from Cameron, Missouri
Mayors of places in Missouri
Republican Party members of the United States House of Representatives from Missouri
People from Decatur County, Indiana
American bankers
People from Daviess County, Missouri
Businesspeople from Missouri
American businesspeople
Burials in Missouri